The 2003 Great Alaska Shootout was held November 26, 2003, through November 26, 2003 at Sullivan Arena in Anchorage, Alaska

Brackets

Men's

Women's

References

Great Alaska Shootout
Great Alaska Shootout
Great Alaska Shootout
2003 in sports in Alaska
November 2003 sports events in the United States